Cymatodera is a genus of checkered beetles in the family Cleridae. There are at least 70 described species in Cymatodera.

See also
 List of Cymatodera species

References

 Burke, Alan F., John M. Leavengood Jr., and Gregory Zolnerowich (2015). "A checklist of the New World species of Tillinae (Coleoptera: Cleridae), with an illustrated key to genera and new country records".
 Corporaal, J. B. / Hincks, W. D., ed. (1950). Coleopterorum Catalogus Supplementa, Pars 23: (Editio Secunda) Cleridae, 373.
 Opitz, Weston / Arnett, Ross H. Jr., Michael C. Thomas, Paul E. Skelley, and J. Howard Frank, eds. (2002). "Family 73. Cleridae Latreille 1804". American Beetles, vol. 2: Polyphaga: Scarabaeoidea through Curculionoidea, 267–280.
 Wolcott, Albert B. (1947). "Catalogue of North American beetles of the family Cleridae". Fieldiana: Zoology, vol. 32, no. 2, 61–105.

Further reading

 Arnett, R. H. Jr., M. C. Thomas, P. E. Skelley and J. H. Frank. (eds.). (21 June 2002). American Beetles, Volume II: Polyphaga: Scarabaeoidea through Curculionoidea. CRC Press LLC, Boca Raton, Florida .
 
 Richard E. White. (1983). Peterson Field Guides: Beetles. Houghton Mifflin Company.

External links

 NCBI Taxonomy Browser, Cymatodera

Tillinae
Cleroidea genera